Make Some Noise is a campaign by Amnesty International that uses music by John Lennon to promote human rights. Well-known artists produce covers of solo-era John Lennon songs exclusively for Amnesty International.

Yoko Ono, widow of John Lennon, donated the recording rights to "Imagine" and John Lennon's entire solo songbook to Amnesty International. Amnesty has since used the rights to encourage new versions of Lennon's songs to be recorded by artists such as R.E.M., U2, Green Day, The Black Eyed Peas, The Cure, The Flaming Lips, Snow Patrol, The Postal Service, Maroon 5, Audrey de Montigny and Steve Barakatt. The global launch of Make Some Noise took place on 10 December 2005, International Human Rights Day, with the release of four exclusive singles available as digital downloads. A fundraising album, Instant Karma: The Amnesty International Campaign to Save Darfur, followed.

Artists and songs
Artists participating in Make Some Noise were involved in the promotion of human rights. These covers are several of Lennon's best-known solo-era songs.

CD 1
U2: Instant Karma
R.E.M.: #9 Dream
Christina Aguilera: Mother
Aerosmith Give Peace a Chance
Lenny Kravitz: Cold Turkey
The Cure: Love
Corinne Bailey Rae: I'm Losing You (live)
Jakob Dylan & *Dhani Harrison: Gimme Some Truth
Jackson Browne: Oh, My Love
The Raveonettes: One Day At A Time
Avril Lavigne: Imagine
Big & Rich: Nobody Told Me
Eskimo Joe: Mind Games
Youssou N'Dour: Jealous Guy

CD 2
Green Day: Working Class Hero
The Black Eyed Peas: Power To The People
Jack Johnson: Imagine
Ben Harper: Beautiful Boy
Snow Patrol: Isolation
Matisyahu: Watching The Wheels
The Postal Service: Grow Old With Me
Jaguares: Gimme Some Truth (Spanish)
The Flaming Lips: (Just Like) Starting Over
Jack's Mannequin feat. *Mick Fleetwood: God
Duran Duran: Instant Karma
a-ha: #9 Dream
Tokio Hotel: Instant Karma
Regina Spektor: Real Love

Campaigns and actions
Make Some Noise is encouraging people to take action in a number of campaigns:
 10,000 paper cranes for freedom of expression in Belarus! Campaign to free prisoner of conscience Zmitser Dashkevich
 Close Guantanamo now! campaign calls for individuals across the world to send in their videos add their voice to the global chorus calling for Guantanamo Bay to be closed now.
 Protect the People of Darfur campaign invites people to join the actor Don Cheadle and Snow Patrol in putting pressure on the United Nations to send peace keeping forces to Darfur,
Control Arms campaign asks individuals to add their face to the Million Faces petition calling for a Global Arms Trade Treaty.

External links
Amnesty International web site

Amnesty International
2005 compilation albums